Nándor Fazekas (born 16 October 1976), is a retired Hungarian handball player.

He made his international debut on 13 May 1998 against Belgium. Since then he participated on six World Championships (1999, 2003, 2007, 2009, 2011, 2017) and five European Championships (2004, 2006, 2008, 2010, 2012).

He was also member of the Hungarian teams which finished fourth at the 2004 Summer Olympics in Athens and the one that finished 4th at the 2012 Summer Olympics

His eldest son, Gergő Fazekas is a professional handball player.

Achievements
Nemzeti Bajnokság I:
Winner: 1999, 2001, 2002, 2003, 2004, 2010, 2011, 2012
Runner-up: 2000
Magyar Kupa:
Winner: 1999, 2000, 2002, 2003, 2004, 2011, 2012
Finalist: 2001
DHB-Pokal:
Finalist: 2009
EHF Champions League:
Finalist: 2002
Semifinalist: 2003
EHF Cup:
Winner: 2009
EHF Champions Trophy:
Finalist: 2002

Individual awards
Hungarian Goalkeeper of the Year: 2009, 2010, 2012
  Golden Cross of the Cross of Merit of the Republic of Hungary (2012)

References

External links
Nándor Fazekas player profile on MKB Veszprém KC official website
Nándor Fazekas career statistics at Worldhandball

1976 births
Living people
People from Kecskemét
Hungarian male handball players
Olympic handball players of Hungary
Handball players at the 2004 Summer Olympics
Handball players at the 2012 Summer Olympics
Expatriate handball players
Hungarian expatriate sportspeople in Germany
Handball-Bundesliga players
VfL Gummersbach players
Sportspeople from Bács-Kiskun County